"Shanshang de xiaowu" was first published in the 8th issue of Renmin wenxue (People's Literature) in August 1985. It is not only Can Xue's masterpiece, but also one of the masterpieces of avant-garde short stories that appeared in the mid-1980s in Chinese literature.
It was then reprinted in Taiwan and translated into at least four English versions. 

The four English versions are 
"The Hut on the Hill", tr. Michael S. Duke, Renditions, nos. 27-28 (Autumn, 1987), and reprinted in Worlds of Modern Chinese Fiction, Michael S. Duke ed., (Armonk: M. E. Sharpe, Inc., 1990)
"The Mountain Cabin", tr. Mei Zhong, Chinese Literature: Fiction, Poetry, Art, (Beijing, Summer, 1989)
"The Hut on the Mountain", trs. Jian Zhang and Ronald R. Janssen, in Dialogues in Paradise, Ronald R. Janssen and Jian Zhang trs., (Evanston:Northwestern University Press, 1989).
"Hut on the Mountain", tr. Zhong Ming. in Formations 3, 3, (Winter 1987).

Historical context 
Can Xue experienced the chaotic years of the Cultural Revolution in her early years. Beginning in 1966, the Cultural Revolution broke out and Can Xue, at that time, has just graduated from elementary school. The revolution forced her to quit her school education and she was ordered to labor in the countryside with all other teenagers.  Because of tuberculosis since childhood, she was able to stay in Changsha. During this period, Can Xue's father was sentenced to prison, and her mother went to the labor camp. The whole family suffered continuously from political and economic persecution. In order make a living, Can Xue worked in a small neighborhood factory for ten years. After the Cultural Revolution ended in 1976, Can Xue's father resumed his job politically and in 1980, and Can Xue also started to run her own sewing business. She began to have more time for her writing.

>Speaking of her motivation for writing during the early ten years, she called it a kind of vengeance. She was unforgettable about the tough memories in her past experience, and the feeling of vengeance drove her to write down her feelings in the emotional realm. The irreconcilability of self and reality made her reflect on the restlessness of human nature. Everyone lives in the opposition between self and reality, and we all need to realize ourselves in the real environment. The self-completion of life is so complicated,  as the liberation of ourselves is the result of the victory of the good side of our human nature in the war of opposites.

Although not educated in school system, Can Xue dived in literature herself, both domestic and foreign, which  profoundly influenced her formation of literary thought. Specifically, she formed her Modernist literary thought and writing style on the basis of Western culture and Western literature. Different from western modernist literary style, Can Xue's works are not written from the character of human beings, but from an abstract perspective to express the spiritual world of humans. They write the story of the soul and its pursuit of human nature. The emphasis on female consciousness and female self is another important aspect of Can Xue's modernist literary thoughts and an important feature of her literary creation.

Summary 
The Hut on the Hill describes the absurd and chaotic life of a family living in a hut on the mountain.

The "I" "I" refers to the protagonist and same applies in the following text) in this work stands up with every vellus hair almost all the time, feeling the outside world vigilantly, and this outside world is the cold and vicious eyes of the house where my family lives.

I liked to organize my desk drawer ever night, but the noise and light in my room drove my mom crazy. She always peeped into the drawer of "I",  and stared fiercely at the back of my head. My parents messed up the drawer and stole her most favorite things:   a set of Go (Go, a type of Chinese chess) was buried near the well, and moths and dragonflies were scattered on the floor. My mother's smile is hypocritical, my father made me feel familiar wolf eyes, my sister's eyes turned green... Hatred and suspicion have become the main theme of the family's daily life.

In terms of the environment, this hut is really dangerous. It is a simple wooden house, surrounded by no one inhabited. I went out and climbed the mountain several times to explore what happened there. When I reached the top of the hill,  all I saw was desolate rocks flashing white flames, no wild grapes, no huts and no people. It is struggling barely by the fierce north wind and the screaming wolf howling. The black wind mixed with the leaves of wild grapes, the stones are shining with white flames under the sun. This kind of environment reveals a gloomy atmosphere everywhere.

In the short story, "I" was constantly controlled and persecuted by my family, and the family relationship was not reliable, which eventually led to my mentally sensitive escaping from the family. On the surface, these phenomena seem to dismantle the unreasonable traditional family conflicts and doubts about family relationships, and strengthen the hatred between people, including the closest people. When looking through these superficial structures, they will find that it is precisely that. Because of the strong spiritual burden brought by my too strong family affection, each of them reacted to escape from the most overwhelming family affection.

Contributions 
As one of Can Xue's representative short stories, Can Xue's other two works published in 1985, Soap Bubbles in Dirty Water (污水上的肥皂泡，Xin Chuangzao 1, 1985) in January and The Bull (Gongniu, 公牛, Furong, 4, 1985)  in April, formed an impulse to the post-mao literary world at that time and laid the foundation for "Can Xue Style" (writing style). Although hailed as one of the leading avant-garde writers in the 1980s, Can Xue is also very different from other avant-gardes. Her modernist literary thought history was formed on the basis of Western culture and Western literature. Therefore, unlike other writers who focus on the character of the characters, she expresses the spiritual world of people from an abstract perspective, writing stories about the soul, and pursuing humanistic literature.

Her writing style has many similarities with Kafka, who is known as the father of modern literature. Although living in different social backgrounds and different life experiences, Kafka and Can Xue have a very similar style of writing, and has the reputation of Oriental Kafka. The biggest similarity between the two is that they are invariably concerned about the absurdity of people and the absurdity of the world. Both novels are permeated with a strong sense of absurdity. Obviously, due to differences in times, life experiences, etc., this absurd consciousness must show certain differences. The absurd consciousness in Kafka's novels points to eternal tragedy, while Can Xue's absurd consciousness is "the night gave me black eyes, but I use it to find light".

The emphasis on female consciousness and female self is an important aspect of Can Xue's modernist literary thoughts and an important feature of her literary creation. Can Xue believes that women are self-digging. The deeper you dig, the wider the passage and the bigger the world. The stronger and more unique the ego of a work, the deeper its spiritual world. Can Xue believes that the exploration of women's self-personality in contemporary Chinese literature is still relatively superficial and has not reached a deeper level. Feminine consciousness is a part of self-consciousness, it is the experience of self-existence by people as an individual gender, which is rooted in Western culture. Women who have been on the margins are most likely to break through their own dilemma. This dilemma also includes a breakthrough from the Chinese female role consciousness of "Xian qi liang mu" (good wife and mother), because women's personal consciousness is stronger than men, and men have more collective consciousness. Can Xue believes that women have always been marginalized and ignored in society. They are less affected by traditional culture than men and have less ideological burden. These are women writers than men. It is easier for writers to obtain their own advantages.

On the basis of critique of the patriarchal culture and its male texts, Can Xue emphasized the inner connection between women's body, language, and psychology with literature, and emphasized women's subconscious desires. It is this kind of desire that constitutes the inner drive of female writers. Creation is an explosion of women's suppressed feminine consciousness, and a liberating act that enables women to transcend their self-structure. Her affirmation of the irreplaceability of female literary creation is a powerful impact on the traditional literary thought centered on patriarchal culture.

See also 
Absurdist fiction
Women writers in Chinese literature
Feminism in China
Avant-garde
Modernism

References 

Short stories set in China
Chinese contemporary short stories
1985 short stories
Absurdist fiction
Works by Can Xue